A statue of Rocky Colavito was unveiled in Tony Brush Park, in the Little Italy neighborhood of Cleveland, Ohio, in 2021.

References

2021 establishments in Ohio
2021 sculptures
Buildings and structures in Cleveland
Monuments and memorials in Ohio
Outdoor sculptures in Ohio
Sculptures of men in Ohio
Statues in Ohio
Statues of sportspeople